Vučenović (Serbian Cyrillic:Вученовић) is a Serbian surname. Notable people with the surname include:

 Aleksandar Vucenovic (born 1997), Austrian footballer
 Marija Vučenović (born 1993), Serbian javelin thrower
 Mario Vucenovic (born 1999), Austrian footballer

See also
 Vacenovice, village in the Czech Republic
 Vucinovic, surname